Abdikarin Dahir is a politician from Somalia. From March 2013 to May 2013, he served as the interim Director of the National Intelligence and Security Agency (NISA).

References

Living people
Year of birth missing (living people)
Somalian politicians